The Slutsk affair refers to the massacre of thousands of Jews and others that occurred in Slutsk, Byelorussia in the Soviet Union, in October 1941, near the city of Minsk while under German occupation during World War II. The perpetrators were a combination of Gestapo special forces and Lithuanian allies of the Third Reich. Nearly 4,000 Jews were murdered over a two-day period along with thousands of non-Jews.

The city of Slutsk had a large concentration of Jews as well as large numbers of Belarusians. Although the German government had previously signed a non-aggression pact (the Molotov–Ribbentrop Pact) with the Soviet Union, the Nazis, emboldened by success in western Europe, planned and executed Operation Barbarossa, and invaded their former ally on June 22, 1941. Along the way, the Nazis picked up a number of allies in satellite nations.

On October 27, 1941, four companies of military police stationed in Kaunas entered the city with the assignment of liquidating the city's Jewish population within two days.  This "special security operation" was led by the Einsatzgruppen (death squads) of the SS, and acted without authorization from the local German civil administration and Security SS authorities that had marshaled various specialized workers from the population.

The Jews were surrounded, removed from their houses and killed en masse, in such a frenzy that not just Jews, but also other people in the area were massacred. The German civil administration in Byelorussian was outraged, after having made great efforts to gain the favor of the local population in accordance with the instructions of the Führer.

Commissioner General of White Ruthenia Wilhelm Kube wrote in protest to his superior and to  Reichsführer-SS Heinrich Himmler:

The letter concluded:

Adolf Hitler, by all accounts, was never notified of the incident and thereafter mistakenly believed that Nazi partisans among the Belarusian population would support the Germans in the continuing invasion.

See also 
 Holocaust
 The Holocaust in Byelorussia
 List of massacres in Belarus

References

External links 
 "The Murder of Soviet Jews"
 

Belarus in World War II
Holocaust massacres and pogroms
The Holocaust in Belarus
Jewish Belarusian history
Slutsk
Mass murder in 1941
October 1941 events